The 2007–08 Latvian Hockey League season was the 17th season of the Latvian Hockey League, the top level of ice hockey in Latvia. Seven teams participated in the league, and HK Liepājas Metalurgs won the championship.

Regular season

Playoffs

External links
 Season on hockeyarchives.info

Latvian Hockey League
Latvian Hockey League seasons
Latvian